The 2013–14 season of U.S. Alessandria Calcio 1912's was their 93rd in Italian football and their 17th in Lega Pro Seconda Divisione (former Serie C2).

Staff
Head coach
  Egidio Notaristefano
Assistant coach
  Giampaolo Ceramicola
Fitness coach
  Francesco Benassi, Andrea Bocchio
Goalkeeper coach
  Gian Luigi Gasparoni
Sporting Director
  Massimiliano Menegatti
Team Manager
  Andrea La Rosa

Medical staff
Director 
Dr. Elena Bellinzona
Team Doctor 
Dr. Biagio Polla
Masseur/Physiotherapist 
Luigi Marostica

Players

Transfers

In

Out

Profiles and statistics

Matches

Lega Pro Seconda Divisione

Coppa Italia Lega Pro

Championship statistics

Results by round

Results summary

References

Alessandria
U.S. Alessandria Calcio 1912 seasons